Bryan Johnson (born January 18, 1978) is a former American football fullback.  He entered the National Football League (NFL) as an undrafted free agent in the 2000 when he signed with the Washington Redskins.  In 2004, he was traded to the Chicago Bears.  He played college football at Boise State University, where he was a linebacker.  Johnson attended Highland High School in Pocatello, Idaho.

In Bears training camp in 2006 he tore part of his hamstring and had surgery a few days later.  Johnson retired from the NFL in 2007 after being on injured reserve for his last season.

References

1978 births
Living people
American football fullbacks
American football linebackers
Boise State Broncos football players
Chicago Bears players
Washington Redskins players
Players of American football from Los Angeles
Sportspeople from Pocatello, Idaho
Players of American football from Idaho
People from Harbor City, Los Angeles